Vyacheslav Mozhayev (born 11 September 1938) is a Soviet sailor. He competed in the Dragon event at the 1960 Summer Olympics.

References

External links
 

1938 births
Living people
Soviet male sailors (sport)
Olympic sailors of the Soviet Union
Sailors at the 1960 Summer Olympics – Dragon
Sportspeople from Saint Petersburg